GRC-6211 is a drug developed by Glenmark Pharmaceuticals which acts as a potent and selective antagonist for the TRPV1 receptor. It has analgesic and antiinflammatory effects and reached Phase IIb human trials, but was ultimately discontinued from development as a medicine, though it continues to have applications in scientific research.

References 

Ureas
Benzopyrans
Fluoroarenes
Cyclobutanes
Spiro compounds